Blackshore Mill is a Grade II listed tower mill at Reydon, Suffolk, England which has been conserved.

History

Blackshore Mill was built c1890 by Robert Martin, the Beccles millwright, who beat Simon Nunn of Wenhaston in gaining the contract for the mill's construction. The mill only worked for about four years before the sails were blown off when the windshaft broke at the poll end. The mill stood derelict for many years until repairs were carried out in 2002 to conserve the mill.

Description

Blackshore Mill is a three-storey tower mill. It had a boat-shaped cap  winded by a fantail. The four Patent sails were carried on a cast-iron windshaft.

References

Windmills completed in 1890
Towers completed in 1890
Windmills in Suffolk
Tower mills in the United Kingdom
Grade II listed buildings in Suffolk
Grade II listed windmills
Reydon